Crapston Villas is a British animated television series, written, created and directed by Sarah Ann Kennedy, in which the characters were made from plasticine and filmed with stop motion clay animation. It was a comedy satire on inner-city London life, directed at a mature audience. It featured a set of characters, living in a grim apartment building in the fictional postcode of SE69, who were plagued by various dilemmas. Foul language, sex and violence are present.

Production
It was made by the Spitting Image Productions company and was originally broadcast on the UK's Channel 4 from 1995 to 1998. It was written by Sarah Ann Kennedy, who was also director (series 1) along with Peter Boyd Maclean (series 2).  The music for the show was composed by Rowland Lee.

Voices were provided by a range of British actors and comedians.

The show was cancelled after its second series by the incoming new head of Channel 4 Television, Michael Jackson, who then bought US import South Park to fill the late Friday night slot vacated by Crapston Villas.

The show would be one of the first animated series on British television to present openly gay characters, specifically Robbie and Larry.

Availability
Each series comprised ten episodes. Series 1 was subsequently issued on video, edited together as a single 100 minute piece ("Crapston Villas – City of Slummington"), while Series 2 was similarly released, but on two videos ("Health Hazard" and "Culture Shock"). In the USA five episodes from Series 1 were released on DVD by the independent production/distribution company Troma Entertainment, but so far no DVD releases of either series have occurred in the UK.

As of January 2012, all 20 episodes of Crapston Villas are available to watch on Channel 4's digital on-demand service 4oD (now called All 4). Reruns of the Series are also available to watch on G.O.L.D. late at night.

Awards
1996 Broadcast Awards: Best New Program

References

External links

1995 British television series debuts
1998 British television series endings
1990s British adult animated television series
1990s British animated comedy television series
British adult animated comedy television series
Clay animation television series
English-language television shows
Channel 4 original programming
Channel 4 comedy
Troma Entertainment films
LGBT-related animated series
Television shows set in London